The hymenopteran family Platygastridae (sometimes incorrectly spelled Platygasteridae) is a large group (over 4000 species) of exclusively parasitoid wasps, mostly very small (1–2 mm), black, and shining, with geniculate (elbowed) antennae that have an eight-segmented flagellum. The wings sometimes lack venation, though they may have slight fringes of setae.

The traditional subfamilies are the Platygastrinae and the Sceliotrachelinae. The former subfamily includes some 40 genera, all of which are koinobionts on cecidomyiid flies; the wasp oviposits in the host's egg or early instar larva, and the wasp larva completes development when the host reaches the prepupal or pupal stage. The latter subfamily is much smaller, including some 20 genera, and they typically have the rudiments of a vein in the forewings. They are generally idiobionts, attacking the eggs of either beetles or Hemiptera.

Platygastridae is one of seven extant families in the superfamily Platygastroidea. For a brief period of time, Scelionidae was considered a subfamily of Platygastridae, but the classification has been revised based on molecular and morphological evidence.

Sceliotrachelinae 
Sceliotrachelinae includes the genus Aphanomerus, which includes a number of species: 

Aphanomerus aureus (Dodd, 1914)
Aphanomerus bicolor (Perkins, 1905)
Aphanomerus flavus (Dodd, 1914)
Aphanomerus niger (Perkins, 1905)
Aphanomerus nigriceps (Dodd, 1914)
Aphanomerus pusillus (Perkins, 1905)
Aphanomerus rufescens (Perkins, 1905)
Aphanomerus sordidus (Dodd, 1914)

Aphanomerus pusillus, a wasp native to Queensland, Australia, has proven effective against the "pandanus planthopper", or Jamella australiae, which has decimated populations of Pandanus tectorius along the coasts of northern New South Wales and Queensland.

References

Peter N. Buhl and David G. Notton, 2009 A revised catalogue of the Platygastridae of the British Isles Journal of Natural History Vol. 43, Nos. 27-28,1651-1703

External links
a citrus blackfly parasitoid, Amitus hesperidum on the UF / IFAS Featured Creatures Web site
Baeus latrodecti Dozier   on the UF / IFAS Featured Creatures Web site

 
Apocrita families
Articles containing video clips